David Tanenbaum (born 1956) is an American classical guitarist.

Career
Tanenbaum made his concert debut at the age of 16. He later studied guitar privately with Rolando Valdés-Blain in New York City. He has since become known as an enthusiastic promoter of new music for his instrument, although his repertoire also includes much music from other periods. Among other works, he has premiered Hans Werner Henze's concerto An eine Aeolsharfe (1985-6) and Peter Maxwell Davies's Sonata (1984).

Since the 1980s, he has taught at the San Francisco Conservatory of Music.

He has recorded two versions of Henze's enormous Royal Winter Music cycle (1976–79), as well as the complete guitar works of Lou Harrison and Terry Riley. His discography also includes music by John Adams, William Bolcom, Alan Hovhaness, Aaron Jay Kernis, Jorge Liderman, Peter Scott Lewis, Ástor Piazzolla, Steve Reich and Michael Tippett, as well as transcriptions of lute music by J. S. Bach, John Dowland, Francesco da Milano and Sylvius Leopold Weiss.

Bibliography 
 David Tanenbaum, "Leo Brouwer's 20 estudios sencillos" / David Tanenbaum ; edited by Jim Ferguson. Publisher: San Francisco : Guitar Solo Publications ; Chester, NY : U.S. & Canadian distribution by Music Sales, c1992. English Physical Details: 37 p. : ill. ; 31 cm. Instruction and study.

References

External links
 David Tanenbaum official site
 Art of the States: David Tanenbaum performing Harp Suite (1952–1977) by composer Lou Harrison
 Interview (1987), by Paul Magnussen

American classical guitarists
American male guitarists
1956 births
Living people
Contemporary classical music performers
Musicians from New Rochelle, New York
20th-century American guitarists
Classical musicians from New York (state)
20th-century American male musicians
San Francisco Conservatory of Music faculty
Albany Records artists